Craig McKay (born 1966) is an American cartoonist who has done freelance cartooning and illustration for numerous of firms.

Biography
McKay was born in Ohio in 1966 but was raised in Indiana. He attended the Art Academy of Cincinnati in Cincinnati, Ohio, graduating with a B.F.A. in 1989. Working as a freelancer since 1990, McKay received the National Cartoonist Society Advertising and Illustration Award in 1999, 2000, and 2008. He and his wife live in Cincinnati.

Awards
 National Cartoonist Society Division Award for Advertising and Illustration
1999 – for his illustration of A Christmas Carol for the Cincinnati Playhouse in the Park
2000 – for his packaging illustrations and character designs for "X-treme Petz," a line of toys
2008

References

External links
 Craig McKay's website, monkeywithcrayon.com
 NCS Awards
 Craig McKay's biography at the NCS site

American cartoonists
Living people
1966 births